Ohr HaTorah may refer to:
 A book by Rabbi Menachem Mendel Schneersohn
 Ohr HaTorah Day School - A former Orthodox Jewish day school in Winnipeg
 A non-affiliated synagogue in Los Angeles, California, led by Rabbi Mordecai Finley.